Markus-Cornel Frohnmaier (born 25 February 1991) is a Romanian-born German politician from Alternative for Germany. He was elected Member of the Bundestag for Baden-Württemberg in the 2017 German federal election.

Frohnmaier was listed as a recipient of financial benefits in OCCRP investigation of Russia's International Agency for Current Policy.

References

See also 

 List of members of the 19th Bundestag
 List of members of the 20th Bundestag

1991 births
Living people
People from Craiova
Romanian emigrants to Germany
German people of Romanian descent
Members of the Bundestag for the Alternative for Germany

Members of the Bundestag for Baden-Württemberg
University of Tübingen alumni